In mathematics, a quasi-polynomial (pseudo-polynomial) is a generalization of polynomials. While the coefficients of a polynomial come from a ring, the coefficients of quasi-polynomials are instead periodic functions with integral period. Quasi-polynomials appear throughout much of combinatorics as the enumerators for various objects.

Equivalently, a function  is a quasi-polynomial if there exist polynomials  such that  when .

Examples
In this case,  is a function . This is known as the Ehrhart quasi-polynomial, named after Eugène Ehrhart.
 
which is a quasi-polynomial with degree

See also
 Ehrhart polynomial

References
 Stanley, Richard P. (1997). Enumerative Combinatorics, Volume 1. Cambridge University Press.  , 0-521-56069-1.

Polynomials
Algebraic combinatorics